Tapp Tarock, also called Viennese Tappen, Tappen or Tapper, is a three-player tarot card game which traditionally uses the 54-card Industrie und Glück deck. Before the Anschluss (1938), it was the preferred card game of Viennese coffee houses, for example, the  Literatencafés and Café Central. Even today Tapp Tarock is played sporadically. The exact date when it appeared is not possible to identify; some sources suggest it may have been developed in Austria in the early 19th century, but its mention in caricature operas in 1800 and 1806 suggest it was well known even by then and must have arisen in the late 18th century. The oldest description of the actual rules is dated to  1821. Tapp Tarock is considered a good entry level game before players attempt more complex Tarock forms like Cego, Illustrated Tarock or Königrufen.

Name 
Tapp is the name of the face-down stack of cards in the middle of the table – in other games known as the talon or stock. The names of other card games are also derived from it, including Tappu or Tappä for the Swiss Tarock variant of Troggu, as well as the Austrian Stubaital valley game of Dobbm and the south German game of Tapp which was an attempt to play Tapp Tarock with ordinary cards.

Other names for Tapp Tarock were Taroc(k)-Tapp(en), Taroc(k)tappen or just Tappen or Tapper. An older name or name of a predecessor game was Pagatjagen; a 42-card variant was Zwölfertarock and a variant with 40 cards was Einfaches Tarock.<ref name=DNB>Tarok] at portal.dnb.de. Retrieved 1 March 2021.</ref> Because the announcement "ich tappe" ("I'll tapp") referred to the lowest level of the game which was soon dropped, it became fashionable to name the game after the next highest level, Dreiern, Dreierl or Dreierles, names which are prevalent to this day in Baden-Württemberg. In the late 19th century the name Zeco''' was also used. That suggests a link with Cego, which refers to the Blind, as the talon is known in that game. Tapp, also called Württemberg Tarock, is a south German game that is not a member of the true Tarock family but may have originated as an attempt to play a form of three-handed Tarock with a standard 36-card, German-suited pack.

 History 
Tapp Tarock is recorded as early as 1800 in Amor und Psyche, an opera by Ludwig Abeille, where the character Jupiter refers to Tarocktappen. It is also mentioned in 1806 in another opera (as Tarocktappen) and in an anthology of letters (as Taroktappen),  both published in Vienna. The first description of its rules, however, appears in Theoretisch-praktische Anweisung zur gründlichen Erlernung des beliebten Tarok-Tappen Spiels, published in Vienna in 1821.

Tapp Tarock is probably the oldest tarock variant in which four basic features of tarock are found together:
 the shortening of the 78-card tarot deck to the current 54 cards
 the conversion from Italian suits to French suits 
 the conversion of The Fool or Sküs (Excuse) to simply being the 22nd and highest trump
 the bonus of winning the final trick with trump 1 (Pagat Ultimo)

The conversion of the Sküs was completed, according to the tarot expert Michael Dummett, in Austria. In Troggu, the older Swiss tarot game, the Fool can function as the highest trump or as the excuse. The introduction of the Pagat Ultimo, according to card game historian John McLeod, is believed to have come from the ancient Italian game of Trappola, which was widely played in Austria as the variant Hundertspiel.

The original 1821 rules only had 3 positive bids: Tapper, Dreier and Solo. Tapper was the lowest bid – announced by saying "I'll tap" (ich tappe) or just tapping on the table – and originally entitled the declarer to exchange with all six cards of the talon and count the discards to his total at the end. By the time the rules had been printed, a Tapper was usually not played out; the declarer simply received the game points for it and the deal passed to the next player in turn. By 1838, Tapp Tarock had become sufficiently popular in south Germany that Tap-Taroc packs were being advertised by C. Diehl of Darmstadt. Likewise in 1872, Tap-Tarock cards were being sold in Karlsruhe alongside Tarock, Whist and Piquet packs. Dummett believed that the game continued to be played in Germany until the end of the 19th century and certainly in continued to be recorded in German and Austria compendia throughout the 19th and 20th centuries. After the Second World War, more complicated variants such as Illustrated Tarock were developed and, today, Dreiertarock is its tournament equivalent.

Tapp Tarock may have experienced a brief vogue in Switzerland for, by 1841, 54-card packs for Tap-Taroc were being produced by F.G. Halbmeyer of Aarau, alongside 78-card packs for Gross Taroc.

Cards
The game is played with the 54-card French suited Industrie und Glück deck. It includes 22 trumps numbered in Roman numerals with the exception of the highest, the Sküs. The second highest trump, the XXI, is known as the Mond while the lowest trump, I, is called the Pagat. The Sküs, Mond, and Pagat are together known as the Trull or 'honours' and are worth 5 points each. Other trumps are worth only 1 point.

The 32 plain suit cards consist of four courts: king, queen, knight and jack, along with four pip cards. The cards rank as follows:
In black suits: king, queen, knight and jack 10, 9, 8 and 7
In red suits: king, queen, knight and jack, 1, 2, 3 and 4.

Kings are worth 5 points, queens 4, knights 3, jacks 2, and the pips 1. Like score counting in other tarot games, 2 points are subtracted from each trick taken. There are 70 card points in a round so to win at least 36 points are needed. Other than card points there are bonus points as described below.

Rules
The following rules for modern Tapp Tarock are based on Mayr and Sedlaczek (2001):

Preliminaries  
The seating order and first dealer may be determined by lot. Dealing and play are anticlockwise.

Dealing 
The dealer shuffles, offer the cards to his left for cutting. He places the top six cards face down to the table as the talon in two crosswise packets of three before dealing 16 cards to each player, anticlockwise, in packets of four and beginning with forehand (to his right). If the cutter 'knocks' the dealer deals each player a packet of sixteen cards in one go.

Bidding
Forehand now opens the bidding (tappen) which rotates anticlockwise. There are four legal positive bids which, in ascending order, are: Dreier ("Three-er"), Unterer ("Lower"), Oberer ("Upper") and Solo. Forehand announces "pass" (ich passe) or "Dreier!" (ich spiele einen Dreier). Bidding must begin with a Dreier and subsequent players must pass or overcall with the next higher bid, unless a player thinks he has a strong enough hand to bid a Solo in which case he may bid "Solo" at the first opportunity when it is his turn. A player whose bid has been overcalled by a later player may, when his turn comes around again, "hold" (ich halte) it, i.e. announce the intention to play the same contract. Once a player has passed, he may not re-enter the bidding. The highest bidder becomes the declarer noting that, if the highest bid is held, positional priority applies and the one who held becomes the declarer.

In a Dreier, Unterer and Oberer, the declarer exposes both halves of the talon and may pick up either half. He then discards three cards which count to his tricks at the end. His discards may not include Kings or Trulls. He may only discard Tarocks if he has no option and must show them to the two defenders. The unused half of the talon is set aside face down again, counting towards the defenders score at the end of the deal.

Parlett (2008) notes that the terms Dreier, Unterer and Oberer originally denoted which half of the talon the declarer could use: in a Dreier he could choose either; in an Unterer he had to take the lower three cards and in an Oberer he had to pick up the upper three cards. In the last two cases, the unused talon half went to the defenders, unseen until play ended. This is verified by Unger (1923). Today there is no difference in the procedure - the declarer may choose either packet - however, the game value is different in each case. Dummett (1980) notes that the older procedure was listed in the Piatnik leaflet on the rules of the game, but that it differed from the other descriptions he had come across. Alscher (2003) includes it as a variation which may be used to make the Unterer and Oberer contracts more difficult. Bernhard Krüpl also records this variant.

In a Solo, the declarer plays without the aid of the talon, which is set aside and counts towards to the defenders at the end of the deal.

For the game values of the different contracts see below.

 Announcements 
The declarer may now may either of two announcements before play begins. Announcements pose greater risk because the defenders gain prior information but awards more bonus points if the declarer succeeds. The possible announcements are:

 Pagat Ultimo. The declarer undertakes to win the last trick with the Pagat (Trump I).  This earns 8 bonus points if successful. If the declarer fails, each defender scores 8 bonus points.
 Valat. The declarer undertakes to win every trick as per a "slam" in French tarot. Value: 24 points.

Game Play
Play is counterclockwise starting with the declarer. Each player must follow suit. If void of that suit, a trump must be played. If void of that suit and trumps, any card can be played but will not win the trick.

 Scoring 
 Card points 
Card points are totalled in the normal way for Tarock games i.e. the cards won are grouped in threes. Each packet of three cards is totted up and 2 card points subtracted. The totals are added to work out the score. A player must score at least 35 points + 2 Blatt to win i.e. 35 and 2/3, which is then rounded up to 36. See scoring in Königrufen.

 Game values and bonuses 
The game values and bonus points are as follows:

 Related games 
There are many variants which are developments or elaborations of Tapp Tarock, the most common today being Dreiertarock and Illustrated Tarock which have more complex rules in bidding and contracts.

 Footnotes 

References

 Bibliography 
 _ (1821), Theoretisch-praktische Anweisung zur gründlichen Erlernung des beliebten des Tarok-Tappen Spiels, Carl Haas, Vienna and Prague.
 Abeille, Ludwig (1800). Amor und Psyche. A mythological caricature in 2 acts.  
 Alscher, Hans-Joachim (2003). "Tapp-Tarock" in Tarock: mein einziges Vergnügen ed. by Alscher. Obersteirische Druck- und Verlagsges., Leoben. 
 
 Furr, Jerry Neill. "Illustrated Tapp" in Tarocchi: An introduction to the many games played with tarot cards. Philebus (2009).
 Kastner, Hugo and Gerald Kador Folkvord. Die große Humboldt-Enzyklopädie der Kartenspiele. Baden-Baden: Humboldt (2005). 
 Mayr, Wolfgang and Robert Sedlaczek. [https://books.google.com/books?id=qb6eGgAACAAJ&q=Das+Gro%C3%9Fe+Tarockbuch Das Große Tarock-Buch. Vienna: Zsolnay (2001). 
 
 Perinet, Joachim (1806). Die neue Alzeste, a caricature opera in knittel (doggerel) rhyme, in three parts. Wallishausser, Vienna.
 Richter, Joseph I. (1806). Briefe eines Eipeldauers an seinen Herrn Vetter in Kakran, Second Letter, Volume 7, Rehm'schen Buchhandlung, Vienna, p.19. 
 Ulmann, S (1887). Illustrirtes Wiener Tarockbuch. Vienna, Pest, Leipzig: Hartleben.
 Unger, Franz (1923). Kleines Lehrbuch des Tarockspiels''. Vienna: Piatnik.

External links
Tapp-tarock rules from Tarockania (archived)
Tapp-tarock rules at tarocchino.com (archived)
Tapp Tarock rules from homer
Tarockvarianten with rules of Tapp Tarock (Piatnik variant)

Tarock card games
Three-player card games
Austrian card games
18th-century card games